This is a list of notable musicians who use Moog synthesizers.

A
ABBA – a minimoog and polymoog played by Benny Andersson
Patrick Adams
Walter Afanasieff - Producer
Air
Don Airey
Damon Albarn - Blur
The Anniversary
Apoptygma Berzerk
Arandel
Arjen Lucassen
Army of Freshmen
Alesso

B
Tony Banks – Genesis – Used a Polymoog mostly on And Then There Were Three (1978) information on the book from Armando Gallo – I Know What I Like (DIY) 1981
Basilica and National Shrine of Our Lady of Consolation Many Synthesizers are used in the church's keyboard section
Les Baxter (See in 1968, Moog Rock Album)
Armin Van Buuren
Leroy Bach – Wilco
Zac Baird – Korn, Everlast, Fear and the Nervous System, Jonathan Davis and the SFA, Maimou
Peter Bardens – Camel
Battlecat – Hip hop producer (Snoop Dogg)
Peter Baumann – solo and with (Tangerine Dream)
Beastie Boys
The Beach Boys
The Beatles – one of the first mainstream albums to use a Moog was Abbey Road
Paul Beaver
Bee Gees – "Sweet Song of Summer", To Whom It May Concern (1972); one of the earliest implementations of a Moog in a popular music record (LP)
Nuno Bettencourt – Extreme, Population1
Marek Biliński – Polish electronic music composer. On his debut album, Garden Of The King Of Dawn, he solely used Minimoog, Polymoog and Micromoog.
Blackmail
Tim Blake – Crystal Machine -Gong & Hawkwind – Moog modular 55, minimoog
Paul Bley – First live performance of a Moog, at Lincoln Center in 1969
Blondie
David Borden – Mother Mallard
David Bowie
The Boxing Lesson – use Moog extensively, often in place of a bass guitar
Black Label Society – Moog used by Zakk Wylde extensively on the 2005 Mafia Album.
Big Wu

C
C28 Music - Moog Matriarch
Cake
Wendy Carlos - Wendy Carlos was one of the first users of Moog's equipment. She even collaborated with Moog during the development of his equipment.
Jesse Carmichael – Maroon 5
Matt Cameron – The drummer of the popular American grunge band Soundgarden.
Jane Child
CKY
Todd Tamanend Clark
Vince Clarke – Erasure – Yazoo
Charlie Clouser – Nine Inch Nails
CHVRCHES
Cloudland Canyon
Phil Collins, Minimoog bassline on "Sussudio" & "Who Said I Would" from the album No Jacket Required (1985)
Coldplay
Jenny Conlee – The Decemberists
Norman Cook
Tom Coppola
The Chemical Brothers
Chick Corea
Chris Cox
Chris Cross - Ultravox - Minimoog
Graham Coxon – Blur
The Cure
Lee Curreri
The Crystal Method
Charly Garcia
Cory Henry – Snarky Puppy
Tony Carey - Rainbow Rising - Minimoog

D

DJ Logic
DJ Quik
Daft Punk
Dana Countryman
Paul Davis
Dean Fertita-Queens of the Stone Age, The Dead Weather
Dave Greenfield - The Stranglers
David Crowder – David Crowder Band
Deadmau5
Dead Disco
Deep Forest
Deftones
Dennis DeYoung – Styx
Depeche Mode – (used Moog Prodigy, Moog Source)
James Dewees – The Get Up Kids and Reggie and the Full Effect
Devo
Travis Dickerson
Disclosure (band)
Thomas Dolby
Don Dorsey - Composer/engineer of Disney's "Main Street Electrical Parade"
Neal Doughty – REO Speedwagon
Micky Dolenz – The Monkees
Geoff Downes – Buggles, Yes, Asia
Daryl Dragon
Dr. Dre
DragonForce
Dream Theater
Dubstar
Duchess Says
George Duke
Jimmy Destri-Blondie Major songwriter and keyboardist who was one of the first users of the Polymoog in such hits as "Heart of Glass" and "Atomic"
Larry Dunn – Earth, Wind & Fire
The Dust Brothers
Lisa Bella Donna

E
Steve Earle
Edan
Keith Emerson – Emerson, Lake & Palmer – Emerson, Lake & Powell -Known to be among the first user of Moog products from 1968, specially a massive custom built modular synthesizer that can be seen in most of his live performances 
Brian Eno – Roxy Music
Gene Eugene - Adam Again and Starflyer 59
Eduardo Parra Former Keyboardist from Chilean band, Los Jaivas

F
Fatboy Slim
Mike Farrell – Morrissey, Macy Gray
Susan Fassbender
Larry Fast
Franz Ferdinand
Dean Fertita – Queens of the Stone Age, The Dead Weather
Doug Fieger – The Knack
John Fogerty
Ben Folds
David Foster (used mostly Minimoog during the 1980s and 1990s, and occasionally used Moog Source and Memorymoog during the 1980s)
Christopher Franke – Tangerine Dream Known from the Virgin years records as a user of a massive custom modular system, and also a minimoog – Rubycon, Ricochet (1975)
Friendly Fires
Florian Fricke who sold his modular to Klaus Schulze.
Eloy Fritsch – Apocalypse
Hans-Jürgen Fritz - Keyboardist of the German prog band Triumvirat.
Edgar Froese – Tangerine Dream Known from the Virgin years records as a user of a custom IIIp modular system, and also a minimoog 
Front Line Assembly
John Frusciante – Red Hot Chili Peppers

G
Madonna Wayne Gacy – Marilyn Manson
Charly García
Gaudi
Maurice Gibb – Bee Gees – "Sweet Song of Summer" To Whom It May Concern (1972)
Gregg Giuffria
Mort Garson – The Wozard of Iz (1969), Black Mass Lucifer (1971), Plantasia (1976)
Martin L. Gore – Depeche Mode
Dave Greenfield – The Stranglers
Goldfrapp
Patrick Gleeson San Francisco-based keyboardist, pioneered synthesizers in rock and jazz, played Moog on 1971 rock album Sunfighter and Herbie Hancock's 1972 Crossings

H
Hailu Mergia
4hero
Jan Hammer – Mahavishnu Orchestra, Jeff Beck, Miami Vice – One of the first users of the Minimoog, known for his guitar-like pitch bending technique.
George Harrison - One of the first pop albums to use the Moog was his Electronic Sound solo LP, recorded (partially) in 1968 and released early 1969. 
Head East
Heart
Herbie Hancock – used a Micromoog, Minimoog and Polymoog, which can be seen on the back cover of his 1979 album Sunlight
John Hawken – Strawbs
Heldon
Gregory Hinde
Hinterland
Ken Hensley
Nellee Hooper
HORSE The Band
Liam Howlett – The Prodigy
Chad Hugo – The Neptunes, N.E.R.D
Hybrid
Dick Hyman

I
Incubus
Isao Tomita

J
J Dilla (used a custom Minimoog Voyager)
Jack's Mannequin
Michael Jackson
James Lascelles - Steve Harley and Cockney Rebel. Played alongside a Korg Trinity ProX-88 keyboard - even in acoustic sets.
Jane Child
Janet Jackson
Randy Jackson (of Journey) - Moog Source (1984-1989, 1993)
Jimmy Jam – Producer, former member of The Time
Chris Jasper
Jean-Michel Jarre
Joy Electric
Los Jaivas – used a minimoog on the album Alturas de Macchu Picchu
Józef Skrzek – leader of Polish group SBB
Jesse Johnson – Of Motion City Soundtrack
Adam Jones – Tool
John Paul Jones – With Led Zeppelin on the song "Friends"
José Cid – On the album 10,000 Anos Depois Entre Venus e Marte
Joel Cummins – of Umphrey's McgeeBilly Joel
Justice
Jordan Rudess – Dream Theater and Liquid Tension Experiment

K
Mark Kelly – Marillion – Used a Minimoog, specially on early albums from 1983 with Fish
Edd Kalehoff
Jesse F. Keeler – Death from Above 1979
Geoffrey Keezer – Christian McBride Band
Brian Kehew – Half of The Moog Cookbook
Kenna
Alicia Keys
Gershon Kingsley – Music to Moog by, etc.
Kontour – (Some Bizzare Records)
Kombi (band) – (used Multimoog)
Kraftwerk (used Micromoog, Minimoog and Polymoog)
Lenny Kravitz
David Kristian
Pamelia Kurstin – theremin artist.
Kashif - artist
Adem K - Australian Indie Rock musician

L
Craig Leon – Avant garde composer Nommos, Producer for The Ramones, Suicide, Blondie, Andreas Scholl
Dan Lacksman - Telex, Electronic System
Ulf Langheinrich
James Lascelles - Steve Harley and Cockney Rebel. Played alongside a Korg Trinity ProX-88 keyboard - even in acoustic sets.
Jon Lord – Deep Purple, Whitesnake
Rhett Lawrence – Producer for The Black Eyed Peas, Kelly Clarkson, Mariah Carey
Geddy Lee – Rush
Rita Lee
Douglas Leedy – Avant garde composer
Lendi Vexer – Diego Guiñazu
Lettuce – LactucariumSteve Lindsey
Christian "Flake" Lorenz (Rammstein)
Linkin Park
Louis Johnson - Used on We Are the World and Back on the BlockMark Linkous – Sparklehorse
The Locust – Post-punk/noise rock/crust punk band
The Lovemakers
Ludo
Jeff Lynne – Electric Light Orchestra – Used a Minimoog on Out of the Blue (1977)
The Listening
John Linnell – in both They Might Be Giants and the early band The Mundanes
Sławomir Łosowski - Kombi
Diana Lewis - used Moog Modular on "First Episode at Hienton" and "The Cage" on Elton John (album) (1970)

M
Mike Mainieri
Manfred Mann – Minimoog from the very beginning around 1972, and recently a Moog Voyager
Mastodon
Martin Gore
Roger Manning – The other half of The Moog Cookbook, keyboards for Jellyfish, Imperial Drag, Beck, Air, and TV Eyes
Mike Pinder – Moody Blues - Used on Question of Balance (1970) and Every Good Boy Deserves Favour Albums (1971)
Terry Manning – One of the earliest uses (1968) on a rock album Home Sweet HomeRay Manzarek – One of the earliest uses on an album, from the psychedelic rock album Strange Days by The Doors
Tommy Mars – in Frank Zappa's band. Can be heard on several Zappa albums and seen in the movie Baby Snakes.
The Moog Cookbook
MGMT – (formerly known as The Management)
Anthony Marinelli  – (synthesizer (and Synclavier) orchestration/composer for film)
Money Mark
Hideki Matsutake
Linda McCartney – Wings
Paul McCartney
Page McConnell – Phish
Roger McGuinn – The Byrds
Gabrial McNair – No Doubt, Oslo
John Medeski – Medeski, Martin and Wood
Max Middleton
John Mills-Cockell Electronic musician from Toronto, Canada who recorded and played live with Moog synths in several bands in the late 60s and early 70s. 
Takako Minekawa
Kerry Minnear – Gentle Giant
Joni Mitchell – On the song "The Jungle Line" from The Hissing of Summer LawnsMoby
The Monkees – Their song "Daily Nightly" was the first known pop recording to feature a synthesizer, namely the Moog Modular synth purchased by Micky Dolenz, only the third to be sold commercially at the time.
Francis Monkman
Hugo Montenegro
Patrick Moraz – Yes, The Moody Blues, Solo albums – in 1979 he used for "Future Memories" live on TV a Minimoog, a special custom double Minimoog and a Micromoog; a Polymoog can also be seen on stage.
Morcheeba
Jim Morrison (The Doors)
Giorgio Moroder and his team – A portable modular system, Minimoog
Thurston Moore – Sonic Youth, on Evol
Steve Morse – Dixie Dregs, Steve Morse Band, Deep Purple, Kansas – In the 70s and 80s Morse played a modified Fender Telecaster run through a homemade effects system using a full Minimoog, both studio and live
Motion City Soundtrack
Jason Mraz
Muse – Minimoogs are used to perform the band's signature synth arpeggios, played live by Dominic Howard and Morgan Nicholls.
Mutemath – Lead singer/keyboardist Paul Meany added a Moog synth as well as a Hammond B3 to his setup for the band's 2011 Odd Soul Introduction Tour.  Moog synthesizers have also featured prominently in some of the band's studio recordings.

N
Pete Namlook
Drew Neumann
New Order
Czesław Niemen
Vittorio Nocenzi  - with the Minimoog for the band Banco del Mutuo Soccorso
Erik Norlander – Rocket Scientists, Featuring John Payne, Lana Lane, Bob Moog Foundation
Gary Numan - notable for the Minimoog, Polymoog and Minimoog Voyager
Neurosis

O
Roger O'Donnell – The Cure, Thompson Twins, The Psychedelic Furs, Berlin, Nine Inch Nails
Mike Oldfield
William Onyeabor
Ryo Okumoto - Spock's Beard
Fernando Otero  - Minimoog

P
Jean-Jacques Perrey
David Paich
Pharrell
Plastiq Phantom
Greg Phillinganes
Mike Pinder –Moody Blues - Used on A Question of Balance (1970) and Every Good Boy Deserves Favour albums (1971)
Gino Piserchio
Bill Plummer
Portugal. The Man
Roger Powell – Todd Rundgren, and the album of Meat Loaf, Bat Out of HellBilly Preston
Steve Porcaro
Don Preston
Prince
Flavio Premoli – Premiata Forneria Marconi
Michael Pinder – The Moody Blues
Pull Tiger Tail – British Indie Band; Moog Rogue, MG-1, Taurus 1 pedals and Little Phatty
PlayRadioPlay! – Daniel Hunter
Portishead – Adrian Utley
Perpetual Groove
Phoenix
Federico González Peña

Q
Queens of the Stone Age – Dean Fertita (Uses a Little Phatty)

R
Radiohead
Robertinho de Recife
Radio Massacre International
Gerry Rafferty – "Whatever's Written in Your Heart". A Minimoog was used for some soft backing effects (as seen in official video).
Jason Rebello
Relient K – Select songs
The Rentals
The Residents
Martin Rev
Trent Reznor – Nine Inch Nails
Nick Rhodes – Duran Duran
David Rosenthal – Billy Joel
Rick Rubin
Jordan Rudess – Dream Theater, Liquid Tension Experiment
Leon Russell
Mike Rutherford – Genesis – Used a Taurus bass pedal from 1975, source from the book "I know what I like" from Armando Gallo 1981
Rwake
Kristoffer Garm Rygg – Ulver
Francis Rimbert
Rush – Geddy Lee

S
Saga
Darian Sahanaja – Heart
David Sancious
Santana
Jan Schelhaas
Jeremy Schmidt of Black Mountain – Moog Source
Klaus Schulze – Minimoogs, Micromoog, Polymoog, Modular, Memorymoog 
Seeed
Mark Shreeve of Redshift – modular 
Eric Siday first user in the sixties, used early modulars
Shaggy
Matt Sharp – Weezer, The Rentals
Claudio Simonetti – Goblin, Daemonia
Paul Shaffer – Late Show with David LettermanTom Schuman – keyboardist from the jazz band Spyro Gyra used a Multimoog and Moog Liberation
Paul Simon
Skinny Puppy
The Sleep-ins
Snarky Puppy
Józef Skrzek
Sniff 'n' the Tears
The Sounds
Soulwax
Space Art used a Polymoog and a Memorymoog.
Stereolab
David Scott Stone
Scott Storch
Suicide
Sun Ra – An idiosyncratic Jazz innovator, recorded and played live with a prototype Minimoog in late 1969 and thereafter made extensive use of Moogs in his music
SPOD  – Minimoog
Sunn O)))
Supremes
Syrinx 3-piece band from Toronto, Canada who recorded and toured 1970–1972 with John Mills-Cockell playing Moog and other synths
Sylvan Esso
Shalabi Effect
Stephan Bodzin

T 

Peter Townshend
Tycho
Richard Tandy – Electric Light Orchestra – Micromoog, Minimoog and Polymoog
Tangerine Dream
Tegan and Sara – Minimoog
Yann Tiersen
The Punk Group – Minimoog Voyager, SubPhatty, Minimoog Model D, Grandmother
Thursday
Isao Tomita – Moog Modular 55 and Custom Modular synthesizers and Polymoog
Tonto's Expanding Head Band
Trentemøller
Trocadero
Roger Troutman - Zapp (band)

U

Ultravox - Notably the distinctive 'Vienna' bassline was performed on a Minimoog by Bassist Chris Cross
The Units – Pioneers of electropunk, Scott Ryser played a Minimoog on all of their records beginning in 1979 and Rachel Webber played a Moog Source.

V
Eddie Van Halen
Manuel Valera currently playing a Moog Little Phatty and Minimoog Voyager
Anthony Cedric Vuagniaux

W
Adam Wakeman With Ozzy Osbourne, Black Sabbath & Strawbs
Oliver Wakeman With Yes on the Fly From Here album
Rick Wakeman
Steve Walsh – Kansas
Kit Watkins – Used a Minimoog with Camel in 1979 on "I Can See Your House from Here", also on solo album Labyrinth (1980)
Whirlwind Heat
Andy Whitmore Record Producer / Keyboard Player, London UK
Alan Wilder – Recoil – Depeche Mode
Ben Wilson – Blues Traveler
Brian Wilson – On The Beach Boys Love You album
Carl Wilson – On the Surf's Up album
Dennis Wilson – On the Pacific Ocean Blue album
Steve Winwood - With the Go band on their albums, Go and Go Live from Paris in 1976 and in his solo albums
Peter Wolf – In Frank Zappa's band.
Stevie Wonder
Bernie Worrell – Keyboard player with Parliament, Funkadelic, and touring member with Talking Heads
Fred Wreck – Hip hop producer (Snoop Dogg)
Richard Wright – Pink Floyd – Used on The Dark Side of the Moon (1973), Wish You Were Here (1975), Animals (1977) and The Wall (1979)
Klaus Wunderlich – Used a custom cabinet Moog modular system on the album Sound Moog 2000 Organ, Rhythm  (1973)
Gary Wright- Spooky Tooth and his solo career
Zakk Wylde – Black Label Society, on the album Mafia''

Y
Akira Yamaoka
Yellow Magic Orchestra
Adam Young – Owl City/Producer/Engineer, Owatonna MN
Larry Young
Yes
Joey Youngman as Wolfgang Gartner

Z
Frank Zappa – had most of his keyboard players played a Minimoog in the '70s and '80s.
Zero 7
Hans Zimmer – Film composer
Zolof the Rock & Roll Destroyer
Zigmars Liepins – (Moog Prodigy)
Zoot Woman

References

Moog synthesizer users
Moog